In enzymology, a 3-phosphoglyceroyl-phosphate—polyphosphate phosphotransferase is an enzyme that catalyzes the chemical reaction

3-phospho-D-glyceroyl phosphate + (phosphate)n  3-phosphoglycerate + (phosphate)n+1

Thus, the two substrates of this enzyme are 3-phospho-D-glyceroyl phosphate and (phosphate)n, whereas its two products are 3-phosphoglycerate and (phosphate)n+1.

This enzyme belongs to the family of transferases, specifically those transferring phosphorus-containing groups (phosphotransferases) with a phosphate group as acceptor.  The systematic name of this enzyme class is 3-phospho-D-glyceroyl-phosphate:polyphosphate phosphotransferase. Other names in common use include diphosphoglycerate-polyphosphate phosphotransferase, and 1,3-diphosphoglycerate-polyphosphate phosphotransferase.

References 

 
 

EC 2.7.4
Enzymes of unknown structure